AfriForum is a South African non-governmental organisation focused mainly on the interests of Afrikaners, a subgroup of the country's white population. AfriForum has been frequently described as a white nationalist, alt-right, and Afrikaner nationalist group, a description rejected by the organisation's leadership, who refer to themselves as a civil rights group.

Established in 2006 to encourage the re-engagement of Afrikaners in the public sphere, it is closely affiliated to the Solidarity trade union, and has attracted significant controversy because of a statement by its leader, Kallie Kriel, that Apartheid was not a crime against humanity.  A court, however, ruled that "Kriel did not justify Apartheid or align himself with the racial discriminatory policies of the past. He stated unequivocally that Apartheid was wrong and that it was a system that infringed on the dignity of people".

History
AfriForum was founded in 2006 following public consultations about its charter.  In the preface to the charter, AfriForum refers to itself as a "citizen's right initiative founded by the trade union Solidarity".

By January 2022 AfriForum had 295 000 contributing members.

Its leader, Kallie Kriel, was previously a member of the Conservative Party, and a leader of the Freedom Front Plus (FF+) youth wing, and a large number of its executive leadership were formerly associated with Freedom Front Plus.

Campaigns, policies and projects

Crime and corruption

Farm attacks
AfriForum has been a vocal critic of the ANC's response to South African farm attacks, claiming that the political party bears a responsibility for "remain[ing] silent" about the violence, and lodging a complaint to the South African Human Rights Commission against the Police Minister for failing to do enough to protect farmers. The organisation launched the book Kill the Boer written by Ernst Roets, the organisation's deputy CEO.

Private prosecutions
The organisation formed a private prosecutions unit, headed by well-known former state prosecutor Gerrie Nel, amid allegations that the National Prosecuting Authority (NPA) was selective in prosecutions, and politically biased.

Education, language and culture
AfriForum has strongly opposed the proposed renaming of South Africa's capital from Pretoria to Tshwane, as well as street renaming in Pretoria.

The organisation campaigns to promote mother tongue education and keep religion in schools.

Land

AfriForum is involved in issues regarding land reform, blaming the "corruption" and "incompetence" of the Department of Rural Development and Land Reform for the slow pace of land reform.

AfriForum has assisted black landowners who were victims of squatters.

The organisation appeared before a parliamentary committee to oppose proposed constitutional amendments to allow for expropriation without compensation, and, in August 2018, AfriForum controversially published a list of farms that are said to be targeted by the government for expropriation without compensation that the organisation received from an anonymous source. Although the organisation received a backlash from some organisations and political parties regarding the legitimacy of the list, the South African Institute for Race Relations confirmed and corroborated the legitimacy of the list.

AfriForum successfully complained about a column published on News24 by journalist Pieter du Toit regarding its testimony before the parliamentary committee discussing amending the constitution to allow for expropriation without compensation.

Racism and hate speech campaigns
In April 2011, AfriForum opened a civil case against Julius Malema, in the Equality Court after he sang the words “dubul’ ibhunu”, which translates as “shoot the boer”, at ANC Youth League gatherings. It was ruled that the song constituted hate speech and undermined the dignity of Afrikaners, and was discriminatory and harmful. In 2012, AfriForum and the ANC reached a settlement before the appeal case was due to be argued in the Supreme Court of Appeal (SCA) in Bloemfontein.

AfriForum has laid criminal charges against other political figures, and social media users that it deemed to be inciting violence and racism, In June the same year, AfriForum said that they plan to lay criminal charges against 100 social media users for incitement of violence. and created a unit against racism and hate speech. It also addressed racist incidents involving a number of people, Dan Roodt, and the paramilitary Kommandokorps. and has stated that it regards the use of the 'k-word' kaffir to be a "gross human rights violation".

In June 2022, AfriForum opened a hate speech case against the Economic Freedom Fighters (EFF) party for six instances between 2016 and 2019 for singing "shoot the boer" at different events. In late August the Johannesburg High Court dismissed the case with costs. Ernst Roets testified as an expert witness with the judge saying that he failed to meet the standards required. AfriForum has stated that it will appeal.

Minority rights
AfriForum has engaged with the United Nations on minority rights issues. and has criticised the ruling ANC about what it claims is a denial of minority rights in the country. However, City Press journalist Adriaan Basson has accused the organisation of overreacting to the situation regarding minority rights. Basson stated in an open letter to AfriForum CEO, Kallie Kriel, that the premise of AfriForum's campaigns is one of victimhood.

International lobbying
Afriforum claimed credit for taking an Australian journalist on a tour of South Africa, and for the "dozens" of articles detailing violent attacks on farms that subsequently appeared in the Australian media.

AfriForum also undertook a tour of the United States that included meetings with John R. Bolton, staffers for Senator Ted Cruz, and an interview on Fox News. AfriForum toured Australia in October 2018 to raise awareness of farm attacks. Ian Cameron from AfriForum was interviewed on Sky News Australia's program Outsiders by Ross Cameron and Rowan Dean. AfriForum also met Australian MP Andrew Hastie and delivered a presentation before the Parliament of Western Australia.

Zimbabwe
The group contested the presence of Robert Mugabe at the 2009 inauguration of Jacob Zuma. It was also involved in a bid to prevent the delivery of Alouette III Air Force helicopters to the Zimbabwean army.

In 2010 a legal team for AfriForum representing farmers in Zimbabwe won a court bid to sue Zimbabwe's government over its “cruel” and “vengeful” expropriation of South African-owned farms. In 2008 the regional court SADC tribunal ruled that Zimbabwe's land reform was illegal and racist, and that those who had suffered discrimination by having their farms expropriated had the right to compensation.

Local government
AfriForum encourages communities to become self-sufficient. Activities undertaken have included a pothole fixing campaign. According to the organization, such initiatives are part of its strategy to hold government responsible for service delivery, and are sometimes supported by local municipalities.

In order to achieve this goal, AfriForum attempts to establish partnerships with municipalities.  The organisation allegedly submits wish lists to municipalities, and municipalities convert it into action plans to address issues. AfriForum says if municipalities do not cooperate in improving service delivery to residents, the organisation approaches courts to order municipalities to enforce service delivery.

An example of intervention by AfriForum in this regard was the urgent order awarded to the organisation against the Vhembe District Municipality by the High Court in Pretoria, forcing the municipality to supply water to Makhado residents.  In a similar case in 2013, the North Gauteng High Court in Pretoria granted AfriForum an order stopping the Madibeng Municipality from cutting electricity supply to Hartbeespoort.

AfriForum's local government interventions have been described positively, even by its critics.

Other campaigns and positions
AfriForum has opposed fracking in the Karoo as well as poaching. It has also campaigned against electronic road tolling in Gauteng.

AfriForum was accepted as amicus curae (friend of the court) during a number of court cases. Cases where AfriForum acted as amicus curae, included those allowing voters overseas to vote in South African elections, protecting mineral rights from expropriation, and allowing public schools to promote adherence to only one or predominantly one religion during their religious school activities. AfriForum also acted as amicus curae (later co-applicant) in a 2017 case against the Minister of Sports and Recreation, and the Olympic Committee, opposing racial quotas in sport after it was discovered that the racial quotas were being applied in the national netball team selection process.

AfriForum Jeug (youth wing)
AfriForum's youth wing is called AfriForum Jeug. It operates as a student organisation with branches at South African universities.

AfriForum Jeug focuses on education issues, including mother tongue education, political interference in student affairs, and affirmative action at universities. A core objective of AfriForum Jeug is for youth to be exempted from affirmative action. The group's non-university activities include organising adventure camps for school learners and fundraising for children's homes. The youth wing claims that one of their biggest aims is to promote "the Christian democratic framework". AfriForum Jeug claims that they focus more on "Afrikaans" interests instead of "Afrikaner" interests.

In 2010, three AfriForum Jeug members were arrested after violating an outdoor advertising by-law to protest the proposed name change of Pretoria.

In 2012, a campaign against racial quotas in higher education saw AfriForum Jeug members paint themselves black to protest the alleged discrimination against 30 learners who were turned away from the University of Pretoria.

In February 2012, AfriForum Jeug joined the South African Progressive Civic Organisation (Sapco), a Khoisan community, in a protest over the land rights of the indigenous group, with both minority groups feeling they have no representation in the current government.

In February 2013 AfriForum Jeug brought a complaint of hate speech against Jason Mfusi, leader of South African Students Congress), who on social media had posted, "My grandfather says 'n goeie boer is 'n dooie boer" ("a good farmer is a dead farmer"). An agreement by means of a mediation process, as requested by the Human Rights Commission (HRC) of the University, and Mfusi had to issue a written apology to the farming community.

In April 2013, a campaign protesting against racial quotas involved charging students of different races different prices for a cup of coffee, with white students paying R5 a cup, coloured and Indians R3, and blacks R1.

In 2014 AfriForum Jeug demanded that the North-West University reject a report into a Nazi-style initiation ceremony at the university's Potchefstroom campus, claiming that the report discriminated against Afrikaners. The report was originally commissioned by Minister of Higher Education and Training Blade Nzimande as an investigation into "the initiation practices and acts of Fascism and Nazism which seem to exist at the institution".

Criticism and controversies
AfriForum is often accused of advancing the white genocide conspiracy theory due to the group's debunked claim that white South Africans are targeted in farm attacks. The organization has denied this and lodged a successful complaint with the Press Council of South Africa against an article from Mail & Guardian that claimed it promotes the idea of a white genocide. Breakfast Show host Bongani Bingwa also apologized after claiming AfriForum had specifically used the phrase "white genocide", saying "Ernst Roets, I owe you an apology, AfriForum has not used the word white genocide."

In October 2010, with regard to AfriForum's response to Absa Bank softening stance on quotas in rugby, Ferial Haffajee wrote in a column in City Press that "while AfriForum is an excellent lobby group with a sense of strategy and tactics, it should be careful that its radical tactics do not dissemble into racist special pleading – a deeply conservative impulse".

In June 2012, the African National Congress Youth League stated that AfriForum is "the defender of white privilege", after AfriForum lodged charges of hate speech with the police and the Equality Court against ANCYL deputy president for statements relating to land held by white farmers.

In a column in July 2012, University of Cape Town Professor Pierre de Vos criticised Minister of Higher Education Blade Nzimande's "blistering attack against the liberal notion of civil society", and stated that the appropriate way to "engage with organisations [such as AfriForum] is not to mutter darkly about how they are trying to take over the country by having the cheek to promote their own ideas" but to "criticise their ideas and the actions they take and provide arguments for why one’s own ideas are better".

The survivalist group Kommandokorps criticised AfriForum in February 2012, saying that AfriForum "had not done much to prevent farm murders". This was in response to AfriForum's criticism of Kommandokorps in which AfriForum CEO Kallie Kriel said that Kommandokorps' treatment of young people at training camps is "immoral and inexcusable".

In February 2014, Flip Buys from the trade union Solidarity (which is associated with AfriForum) called for a boycott of the Afrikaans newspaper Beeld that reported that a group of Potchefstroom students gave the Nazi salute during their initiation.

Towards the end of 2014, the Commission for the Promotion and Protection of the Rights of Cultural, Religious and Linguistic Communities, criticised AfriForum's "Save Afrikaans schools" campaign in a press release. The campaign followed Gauteng Department of Basic Education's decision to force three Afrikaans-medium schools in Fochville to relinquish their status as Afrikaans-medium schools at the start of the 2012 school year.

In June 2015, AfriForum Youth said that allegations of racism against Curro Foundation School are themselves racist. In a statement by the organisation's chair it was said "To portray an Afrikaans class being transported as class group falsely as racial segregation, is beyond absurd".

In July 2016, Afriforum applied to the Western Cape High Court to have posts on social media removed that stated that AfriForum supporters had "threaten to rape women" and had "used rape to intimidate a rape survivor", on the grounds that such claims are defamatory and that the claims were false. However, the judge ruled that AfriForum protestors did in fact "commit assault, sexual violence, sexual aggression and intimidation" against the anti-rape culture protesters. The judge noted that while some of the statements about rape threats were not literally true, the social media poster is "entitled to a certain amount of latitude in describing the confrontation" due to strong emotions elicited by the issue.

In August 2016 eight students affiliated with AfriForum youth wing were suspended from Stellenbosch University Student Representative Council (SRC) elections after allegations of campaign irregularities. The three plaintiffs also considered some of AfriForum's election posters to be controversial. AfriForum applied to the High Court to have the suspension overturned, and the case was eventually settled out of court. The university's student appeal court lifted the suspension one month later, stating the student court had acted outside its mandate.

In May 2018, following criticism of AfriForum by a North-West University professor, Elmien du Plessis, Afriforum's deputy CEO, Ernst Roets, posted a YouTube video where he quoted Victor Klemperer, stating that "if the tables were turned after the Holocaust he "would have all the intellectuals strung up, and the professors three feet higher than the rest; they would be left hanging from the lamp posts for as long as was compatible with hygiene." Following the video posting, du Plessis and her family received threats of violence. A petition condemning the threats against academics was subsequently circulated.

The organization attracted significant controversy in May 2018, when AfriForum CEO Kallie Kriel was asked near the end of a radio interview whether he believed Apartheid was a crime against humanity, to which he replied by saying "I don’t think that apartheid was a crime against humanity, but I think it was wrong.". The organisation had previously described Apartheid as a "so-called historical injustice" and its deputy leader Ernst Roets has described Apartheid as a "wooly concept".

In a newspaper column in May 2018, Max du Preez described AfriForum's position as "reactionary identity politics". He said that AfriForum "now totally dominates the socio-political discourse among white Afrikaners" and that they are "sanctioned by soft editorials and columns by prominent members of the Afrikaans commentariat". He claimed that some Afrikaners who criticised AfriForum were "aggressively demonised, insulted, belittled and even threatened".

In a radio interview in May 2018, vice chancellor of the University of the Witwatersrand Adam Habib criticised AfriForum for "linking up with fascists" such as the French National Front, the Italian Five Star Movement, Germany's AfD and US president Donald Trump's national security adviser John Bolton, whom Habib referred to during the same interview as "a known fascist", during Kriel and Roets' 2018 world tour.

In March 2019, AfriForum released a documentary called Disrupted Land, about land reform and expropriation in South Africa. In one clip, an interviewee defends HF Verwoerd's policies. This led the Institute of Race Relations to accuse Afriforum of "sanitising the motives behind apartheid and the brutality of its practices" and of "soft-soaping the evils of apartheid".

In July 2018, The Huffington Post SA published an editorial with several claims about AfriForum. The press ombudsman's investigation revealed that the editor had blundered badly by assuming that AfriForum and Solidarity was the same organisation, and that claims and actions that were ascribed to AfriForum did in fact relate entirely to Solidarity. The ombudsman rejected Huffington Post's editor's reasoning that AfriForum and Solidarity is the same organisation because among others they are both part of the "Solidarity Movement" and because their head offices are in the same building. The press ombudsman ruled that Huffington Post's bungle was a "serious breach" of the press code.

References

External links

2006 establishments in South Africa
Afrikaner culture in South Africa
Afrikaner organizations
Civil rights organizations
Organizations established in 2006
Political advocacy groups in South Africa
White South African culture
Afrikaner nationalism